Critoniella is a genus of South American flowering plants in the family Asteraceae.

 Species
 Critoniella acuminata (Kunth) R.M.King & H.Rob. - Venezuela, Ecuador, Colombia, Peru
 Critoniella albertosmithii (B.L.Rob.) R.M.King & H.Rob. - Colombia
 Critoniella lebrijensis (B.L.Rob.) R.M.King & H.Rob. - Colombia
 Critoniella leucolithogena (B.L.Rob.) R.M.King & H.Rob. - Ecuador, Colombia
 Critoniella tenuifolia (Kunth) R.M.King & H.Rob. - Colombia, Venezuela
 Critoniella vargasiana (DC.) R.M.King & H.Rob. - Venezuela

References

Eupatorieae
Asteraceae genera
Flora of South America